The Ministry of Industrial Policy of Ukraine is a former government ministry of Ukraine; it was the main body in the system of central bodies of the executive power. It was created from the former Ministry of Economy and initially was created as Ministry of Machinebuilding, Military-Industrial Complex and Conversion in 1996 and merged with the Ministry of Economic Development and Trade in March 2014 with headquarters in Kyiv.

Sectors of industry
 General machinebuilding
 Metallurgy
 Chemical sector
 Light and Woodprocessing Industry
 Radio-electronic sector and instrument production
 Non-ferrous metallurgy and secondary metals
 Machinebuilding (APK; Ministry of Agrarian Policy)
 Defense Industrial Complex

History
 Ministry of Machinebuilding, Military-Industrial Complex and Conversion: 1996 - 1997
 Ministry of Industrial Policy: 1997–2000
 State Committee of Industrial Policy: 2000–2001 (partially responsible to Minister of Economy)
 Ministry of Industrial Policy: 2001–2011
 State Agency in Management of State Corporation Rights and Property: 2011–present (some authority)
 Ministry of Economical Development and Trade: 2011–present (merged)
 Ministry of Industrial Policy

List of Ministers of Industrial Policy

See also
Cabinet of Ministers of Ukraine
Ministry of Strategic Industries of Ukraine
Ministry of Energy (Ukraine)
Ukraine's industrial complex

References

External links 
 Official Website of the Ukrainian Ministry of Industrial Policy

Industrial Policy
Industrial Policy
Ukraine, Industrial Policy
Ukraine
1997 establishments in Ukraine
2014 disestablishments in Ukraine
Government agencies established in 1997
Government agencies disestablished in 2014